Mohammad Hafiz bin Abu Bakar (born 1 January 1988) is Malaysian footballer for Sarawak in the Malaysia Premier League as a midfielder.

Career statistics

Club

References

External links
 

1988 births
Living people
Malaysian footballers
Sarawak FA players
Malaysia Super League players
Association football midfielders